Rüdiger Frank (born 1969) is a German economist and expert on North Korea and East Asia. He currently lives and works in Vienna, Austria, as a tenured full professor of East Asian economy and society at the University of Vienna. Frank also serves as the head of the Department of East Asian Studies in Vienna and is an adjunct professor at Korea University and at the University of North Korean Studies in Seoul.

Frank's main areas of research are socialist transformation in East Asia and Europe, with a focus on North Korea, state-business relations in East Asia, and regional integration in East Asia.

Frank received an MA in Korean studies, economics, and international relations at Humboldt University of Berlin and a PhD in economics from Mercator-University in Duisburg. Prior to his appointment as professor of East Asian economy and society at the University of Vienna, he taught at Columbia University's School of International and Public Affairs in New York from 2002 to 2003.

Academic career 
Born and raised in East Germany and the Soviet Union, and having spent one semester as a language student at Kim Il-sung University in Pyongyang in 1991-1992, Frank is one of very few experts on North Korea who have lived in and experienced German, Soviet, and North Korean socialist systems for a substantial period of time. He uses his equally rare combined background in economics, Korean studies, and international relations to analyze and comment on a wide range of economic and security issues in East Asia and North Korea from various perspectives. In 2014, his unique insights into North Korea culminated in the book Nordkorea. Innenansichten eines totalen Staates.

Frank is chair professor of East Asian economy and society at the University of Vienna and head of the Department of East Asian Studies. He is also an adjunct professor at Korea University and at the University of North Korean Studies (Kyungnam University), Seoul. He holds an M.A. in Korean studies, economics and international relations and a Ph.D. in economics. Visiting professorships have included Columbia University, New York, and Korea University, Seoul.

In 2013, the Frankfurter Allgemeine Zeitung ranked Frank one of Germany's 50 most influential economists.

Current academic positions 
His functions include:
 Head of the Department of East Asian Studies at the University of Vienna
 Professor of East Asian Economy and Society at the University of Vienna
 Council Member of the Association for Korean Studies in Europe
 Council Member of the Austrian Association of University Professors
 Deputy chief editor of the European Journal of East Asian Studies
 Co-editor of the book series Korea: Politics, Economy, Society
 Member of the board of editors, Brill's Korean Studies Library
 Member of the scientific advisory board for Korea and Japan, German Association of Asian Studies
 Member of the World Economic Forum
 Associate, Japan Focus: The Asia-Pacific Journal

Consulting 
Frank is regularly consulted by governments, media, and business on North Korea and East Asia. This included consultancy work and a background policy paper for the visit by President of Finland Martti Ahtisaari, Prime Minister of Norway Gro Harlem Brundtland, U.S. President Jimmy Carter, and President of Ireland Mary Robinson to the Korean Peninsula and China.

References

External links 
 Overview and access to papers of Rüdiger Frank
 MA and PhD program "East Asian Economy and Society at University of Vienna
 Video: Rüdiger Frank at Columbia University
 ZDF Interview with Rüdiger Frank
 Rüdiger Frank: Harbinger or Hoax: A First Painting of Kim Jong Un?
 Rüdiger Frank: Hu Jintao, Deng Xiaoping or Another Mao Zedong? Power Restructuring in North Korea
 Ruediger Frank at World Economic Forum

1969 births
German scholars
German columnists
German economists
Living people
Academic staff of the University of Vienna
German male non-fiction writers
Kim Il-sung University alumni
Humboldt University of Berlin alumni